The Golden Rose Synagogue, known also as the Nachmanowicz Synagogue, or  the Turei Zahav Synagogue  was a synagogue in Lviv, western Ukraine. The Golden Rose Synagogue was the oldest synagogue in what is now Ukraine.

History
A midtown plot of land was bought in 1580, and the synagogue was founded and funded in 1581 by Yitzhak ben Nachman (Izak Nachmanowicz), a financier to Stefan Batory, King of Poland. Therefore, the oldest name of the synagogue was the Nachmanowicz Synagogue.

It was built in 1582 by Paulus Italus ("Paolo the Italian") from Tujetsch (Tschamut) village in canton Graubünden, Switzerland, a master builder known by his guild nickname Paweł Szczęśliwy (Paul the Fortunate, in Polish).

In 1595, the same Paolo,  assisted by Ambrogio Nutclauss (alias Ambroży Przychylny), by Adam Pokora, and by master Zachariasz (most probably, Zachariasz Sprawny, alias Zaccaria de Lugano) built a vestibule and a women's gallery in the synagogue. Men prayed in a hall that was spanned by a cloister rib vault  with pointed lunettes above the windows. An alabaster Torah ark in renaissance style was located at the eastern wall. A bimah was located in the middle of the prayer hall. The building was topped by an attic in Mannerist style.

In 1606 the building was confiscated by the Jesuits.  In 1609, after paying a ransom of 20,600 guilders the synagogue was returned to the Jewish community. A local legend (first published in 1863) ascribed the merit of the restitution of the synagogue to Rosa bat Ya'akov, Yitzhak's daughter-in-law. The synagogue was therefore also called the Golden Rose Synagogue after her. Rabbi Yitzhak ben Shemuel HaLevi composed in 1609 Shir Ge'ula (a Song of Deliverance) – which was read each year as a part of the shacharit prayer on Shabbat following Purim. The Song of Deliverance compared the return of the synagogue to the Jewish community to the salvation of the Jews from the Babylonian and Egyptian captivities.

In 1654-67, rabbi David HaLevi Segal, called TaZ after his main work Sefer Turei Zahav, the younger brother of Yitzhak HaLevi and his pupil, prayed in this synagogue. For that reason the building was also named the TaZ Synagogue.

In 1941, the synagogue was desecrated, and in 1943 ruined by the Nazis.

There is a plaque commemorating the Golden Rose Synagogue: "Remnant of the old temple called 'Di Goldene Royz'. Built during 1580-1595 by the Nachmanowicz family in the memory of Nachmanowicz's wife. The building designed by the Italian architect Pablo Romano was destroyed by Nazis and burnt in summer 1942."

The members of the Jewish community of Lviv desire a reconstruction of the synagogue "as it once was". The project by the Office of Historic Environment Preservation of Lviv City Council, commissioned 2016, envisages a commemorative space. "Rebuilding of the Golden Rose Synagogue is not foreseen in the plan."

Conservation
The synagogue was designated a World Heritage Site in 1998.  The article by Tom Gross published in The Guardians "comment is free" section on September 2, 2011 under the headline "Goodbye Golden Rose" reported that the authorities in Lviv, contrary to Ukraine's laws designed to preserve historic sites, were allowing a private developer to demolish parts of the adjacent remnants of the synagogue complex in order to build a hotel, which would endanger the mikvah and other Jewish artifacts, as well as possibly the remaining outer walls of the synagogue itself. Lviv officials refuted that information. Reacting to international pressure generated by Gross's article, and by pressure from the Ukrainian president's office in Kyiv, the city authorities ordered a halt to the hotel work in order to preserve the Jewish artifacts and to ensure the synagogue's outer walls would not be threatened. The mayor of Lviv also announced the city would proceed with long-delayed plans to build a Holocaust memorial near the Golden Rose synagogue in the former Jewish quarter of Lviv's old town.

In July 2015 the Center for Urban History of East Central Europe, in partnership with a coalition that includes the Lviv City Council and the city's Office for Historical Environment Preservation, along with several US-, German- and Israeli-based groups, started work on the Space of Synagogues project. The initiative aims to commemorate the history of the Jewish community in Lviv by creating new memorial and educational spaces in the city, with attention to the sites of destroyed synagogues. Some assert that this project will contribute significantly to the conservation of the remains of the Golden Rose Synagogue.  Others, however, believe that the Center caters to the local government, which, in view of its recent support of the plan to build a hotel on the site, has de facto thwarted the restoration of the synagogue.

Controversy
Adjacent to the site of the synagogue, Ukrainian entrepreneurs run a Jewish-themed restaurant, Under the Golden Rose, which opened in 2008. The restaurant claims to honour the city's Jewish past. Diners are, for example, offered black hats with artificial sidelocks attached (suggestive of the traditional look of a religious Eastern European Jew); and, concerning the absence of prices from the menu, servers explain that it is Jewish tradition to bargain over the prices. Some local historians and members of the city's small Jewish community, as well as Jewish visitors from abroad, find such an approach kitschy and offensive, and argue that it fosters antisemitic stereotypes.

Gallery

See also
 Oldest synagogues in the world

References

External links

 Goldene Rose (Taz, Turei Zahav, Nachmanowicz) Synagogue in the Bezalel Narkiss Index of Jewish Art, the Center for Jewish Art, the Hebrew University of Jerusalem 
 Interactive Map by the Center for Urban History of East Central Europe, Lviv
 Brief history by the Center for Urban History of East Central Europe, Lviv

 Sergey R. Kravtsov, Di Gildene Royze: The Turei Zahav Synagogue in L'viv (Petersberg, 2011)
Traces Of The Golden Rose Synagogue – Beyond the End of a History in Lviv (Part One – Text) by Chris Wilkinson, Europe Between East & West Blog 18 November 2015
 Traces Of The Golden Rose Synagogue – Beyond the End of a History in Lviv (Part Two – Photos) by Chris Wilkinson, Europe Between East & West Blog 18 November 2015

Synagogues in Lviv
Former synagogues in Ukraine
Synagogues destroyed by Nazi Germany
16th-century synagogues
Religious buildings and structures completed in 1582
Religious organizations established in the 1580s
Ruins in Ukraine
World Heritage Sites in Ukraine
Orthodox synagogues in Ukraine